Unto Those Who Sin is a 1916 American silent drama film directed by William Robert Daly and starring Fritzi Brunette, Earle Foxe and Lillian Hayward.

Cast
 Fritzi Brunette as Nadia 
 Al W. Filson as Pierre Duprez 
 Lillian Hayward as Mme. Duprez 
 Marion Warner as Mabel 
 Edward Peil Sr. as Stokes 
 Earle Foxe as Ashton 
 George Larkin as Phillip Morton 
 William Sheer as Amos Lawlor 
 George Hernandez as Jules Villars 
 Louise Sothern as Isobel 
 Marie Prevost as Celeste 
 Jack Albert as Buttons

References

Bibliography
 Brent E. Walker. Mack Sennett’s Fun Factory: A History and Filmography of His Studio and His Keystone and Mack Sennett Comedies, with Biographies of Players and Personnel. McFarland, 2013.

External links
 

1916 films
1916 drama films
1910s English-language films
American silent feature films
Silent American drama films
American black-and-white films
Films directed by William Robert Daly
1910s American films